William Brownbill (19 January 1864 – 29 April 1938) was an Australian politician. He was a member of the Victorian Legislative Assembly on two occasions from 1920 to 1932, then from 1935 until his death in 1938. He represented the electoral district of Geelong for the Labor Party. Upon his death, he was succeeded as member for Geelong by his second wife, Fanny.

Brownbill was born in Newtown, a suburb of Geelong in 1864. His parents were William Brownbill, an English emigrant shopkeeper, and Margaret Tattersall from the Isle of Man. Brownbill worked initially in his brother's jewellery shop, but became a baker's apprentice and by around 1895 was a master baker. His first wife was Margaret Murray whom he married in 1887 and with whom he had three sons and a daughter. Margaret died in 1913, and in 1920 he married his housekeeper, Fanny Alford, with whom he had a son and a daughter.

In 1896, Brownbill was elected to the Geelong City Council, and served as Mayor of Geelong from 1914 to 1915. In 1920, he ran for election to state parliament, winning the seat of Geelong for the Labor Party. In 1932, he was defeated in the election by Edward Austin, but re-contested and regained the seat in 1935. Brownbill died in 1938, and the ensuing by-election saw his widow, Fanny Brownbill, elected as his replacement—the first woman representing the Labor Party elected to a parliamentary seat in Victoria.

References

1864 births
1938 deaths
Members of the Victorian Legislative Assembly
Mayors of Geelong
Australian bakers
Australian people of English descent
Australian people of Manx descent
Australian Labor Party members of the Parliament of Victoria